Crambus theseus is a moth in the family Crambidae. It was described by Graziano Bassi in 2000. It is found in Kenya.

References

Crambini
Moths described in 2000
Moths of Africa